Derek Carl Bunch (born October 28, 1961) is a former American football linebacker in the National Football League. He played for the Washington Redskins as a replacement. In 2018, Derek was awarded a Super Bowl ring for playing for the Redskins in 1987, the year they won Super Bowl XXII.

Career

After having a great start in high school, Derek played for the Michigan State Spartans, succumbing to injuries during his sophomore and junior years. After performing well during his senior year, as well as his redshirt extra year, Derek was drafted by the Portland Breakers of the USFL, but he declined to join the 1985 NFL Draft, where he went undrafted. He joined the San Francisco 49ers  in 1985 and 1986, and the Minnesota Vikings in 1987, but was cut each time. In 1987, the Washington Redskins hired him to be a replacement player on the team. He played three games, winning each one. He got half a share of playoff money, amounting to roughly 27,000 dollars.

Derek, along with the other replacements, was mentioned in an ESPN documentary titled "Year of the Scab" and was the inspiration for the 2000 film The Replacements. In 2018, Derek was awarded a Super Bowl ring for playing for the Redskins in 2017, the year they won Super Bowl XXII.

Family
Derek has a wife named Pyper, and three children, named Kristin, Derek Jr., and Dominion.

References
 

1961 births
Living people
American football linebackers
Michigan State Spartans football players
Washington Redskins players
People from Dayton, Ohio